Tiedemannia is a small genus of flowering plants in the carrot family known as cowbanes and dropworts. Species in this genus have been formerly classified in the genera Conium, Oenanthe, and Oxypolis.

, Kew's Plants of the World Online accepts two species in the genus Tiedemannia:

Tiedemannia canbyi  – Canby's cowbane, Canby's dropwort
Tiedemannia filiformis  – water cowbane, water dropwort

References

Tiedemannia
Apioideae genera